Gustav Jonson (born Gustav Joonson; 7 January 1880 – 15 November 1942) was an Estonian military soldier of the Russian Empire, Estonia, and the Soviet Union.

Biography 
Gustav Jonson was born Gustav Joonson to Jüri and Mari Joonson (née Adamson) at Kudu farm, Päri Parish (now in present-day Viljandi Parish). In 1914 he graduated from Riga Polytechnical Institute. He participated in World War I. In 1917 he returned to Estonia, and he formed the 1st Cavalry Regiment. The regiment participated in the Estonian War of Independence. From 1918 to 1924 he was the commander of the 1st Cavalry Regiment. From 1927 to 1928 he was the head of Estonian Military Academy. From 1934 to 1939 he was the assistant officer of the state elder Konstantin Päts.

In 1939, the then 59-year-old Jonson resigned from active service with the rank of Major General due to exceeding the age limit. After the Stalinist Soviet invasion and occupation of Estonia on 16-17 June 1940, a few days later Jonson was reinstated to service and appointed Commander of the Estonian Army to replace the previous Commander-in-Chief Johan Laidoner who had been forced to resign by the Soviet authorities.
 Jonson formally remained commander of the armed formation after it was renamed the "Soviet Estonian People's Army", and then also after it became part of the Soviet Red Army' (as the "22nd Estonian Territorial Rifle Corps"). In that capacity he was promoted in February 1941 to Lieutenant General of the Red Army.

At the beginning of June 1941, the Stalinist regime released all Estonian generals from the command of the "Estonian Territorial Rifle Corps". On 13 June 1941, Jonson was sent to the General Staff Academy in Moscow, where the Soviet authorities arrested him on 19 July 1941. On 15 May 1942, Jonson was sentenced to death. Jonson was executed Chelyabinsk, Soviet Russia on 15 November 1942.

Awards

Russian Empire
  Recipient of the Saint George Sword, 1917.
  Knight 3rd Class Order of Saint Anna,
  Knight 2nd Class Order of Saint Anna,
  Knight of the Order of St. Stanislaus,
  Knight Commander of the Order of St. Stanislaus,

Estonia
  Knight of the Cross of Liberty I Grade, 3rd Class, 1920.
  Knight of the Cross of Liberty II Grade, 2nd Class, 1920.
  Knight 1st Class Order of the Cross of the Eagle, 1933.
  Knight 1st Class Order of the Estonian Red Cross, 1934.

Soviet Union
  Recipient of the Order of the Red Banner,

Foreign
  Knight 3rd Class of the Latvian Order of Lāčplēsis, 1924.
  Grand Officer of the Latvian Order of the Three Stars, 
  Officer's Cross of the Polish Order of Polonia Restituta,
  Commander of the Swedish Order of the Sword, 1st class (1932), 
Swedish Order of the Pole Star, Grand Cross (1936)
  Commander of the Finnish Order of the White Rose,

References

1880 births
1942 deaths
People from Viljandi Parish
People from Kreis Fellin
Estonian major generals
Soviet lieutenant generals
Imperial Russian Army officers
Riga Technical University alumni
Russian military personnel of World War I
Estonian military personnel of the Estonian War of Independence
Soviet military personnel of World War II
Recipients of the Gold Sword for Bravery
Recipients of the Order of St. Anna, 2nd class
Recipients of the Order of St. Anna, 3rd class
Recipients of the Order of Saint Stanislaus (Russian), 2nd class
Recipients of the Order of Saint Stanislaus (Russian), 3rd class
Recipients of the Cross of Liberty (Estonia)
Recipients of the Military Order of the Cross of the Eagle, Class I
Recipients of the Order of the Red Banner
Recipients of the Order of Lāčplēsis, 3rd class
Recipients of the Order of the Three Stars
Order of the White Rose of Finland
Recipients of the Order of Polonia Restituta
Recipients of the Order of the Sword
Estonian people who died in Soviet detention
Soviet rehabilitations